Treaty of Kalisz may refer to

 Treaty of Kalisz (1343), between the Teutonic Knights and Poland
 Treaty of Kalisz (1813), between Prussia and Russia against Napoleonic France